Constance Elizabeth Martyn (4 December 1886 – 27 May 1971) was an Australian actress of stage and screen best known for playing Ma Rudd in Dad and Dave Come to Town.

Select filmography
The Woman Suffers (1918)
Dad and Dave Come to Town (1938)
Dad Rudd MP (1940)

Select theatre credits
Little Lord Fauntleroy (1909–10)
Her Forbidden Marriage (1914)
Married to the Wrong Man (1915)
For King and Country (1915)
A Woman Adrift (1915)
Kultur (1916)
The Night Side of London (1917)
East Lynne (1917)
The Bad Girl of the Family (1917)
Between Two Women (1918)
Sons of the Empire (1922)

References

External links

20th-century Australian actresses
1886 births
1971 deaths
People from Charlton, Victoria